Tiltill Creek is a stream in the U.S. state of California. It empties into the Hetch Hetchy Reservoir. Tiltill Creek is entirely within Yosemite National Park.

"Tiltill" is a name derived from a Native American language meaning "tarweed".

References

Rivers of Tuolumne County, California